Jaie Laplante (born January 8, 1970) is a Canadian-American screenwriter, actor and curator.

Born in Alberta, Canada, Laplante's notable credits include co-screenwriter of Sugar, for which he received a nomination in the Best Adapted Screenplay category of the 2005 Academy of Canadian Cinema & Television's 25th Genie Awards, along with co-writers John Palmer and Todd Klinck.  As an actor, he appeared in  Frisk, directed by Todd Verow.

Laplante is currently executive director and chief curator of Miami International Film Festival, which he has programmed since 2010.

References

1970 births
Living people
Canadian male screenwriters
Canadian male film actors
Male actors from Alberta
Canadian gay writers
21st-century Canadian screenwriters
21st-century Canadian male writers
Canadian LGBT screenwriters
Gay screenwriters
21st-century Canadian LGBT people